Mount Andromeda is located within the Columbia Icefield on the boundary of Banff and Jasper national parks. The mountain can be seen from the Icefields Parkway (#93) near Sunwapta Pass and is 2.3 km WSW of Mount Athabasca. Mt. Andromeda was named in 1938 by Rex Gibson, former president of the Alpine Club of Canada, after Andromeda, the wife of Perseus. From the Climber's Guide:

 "A deservedly popular peak, well seen and easily accessible from the Icefields campground via the road to the snowmobile parking lot."

Routes 
There are several mountaineering and climbing routes on Andromeda. The Skyladder is the normal and very popular glacier route.

References

External links
Mt. Andromeda on SummitPost

Three-thousanders of Alberta
Mountains of Banff National Park
Mountains of Jasper National Park